Grevillea repens, the creeping grevillea, is a species of flowering plant in the family Proteaceae and is endemic to Victoria, Australia. It is a prostrate, often mat-forming shrub, that has leaves with 5 to 19 teeth or lobes, and light green or grey, toothbrush-like flowers with reddish striations and a deep red, or dull orange to yellow style.

Description
The teeth are sometimes sharply pointed and the lower surface is usually covered with wavy hairs pressed against the surface.

Taxonomy
Grevillea repens was first formally described in 1853 by Ferdinand von Mueller from an unpublished description by Carl Meissner and von Mueller's description was published in the Votes and Proceedings of the Legislative Assembly of the Victorian Government. The specific epithet (repens) means "prostrate" or "creeping".

This grevillea is a member of the 'southern holly-leaf grevilleas' and is closely related to G. obtecta.

Distribution and habitat
Creeping grevillea is found in montane eucalypt forests in two main areas in central Victoria: an eastern population centred in the Kinglake area, and a western population, from near Daylesford to the Lerderderg Gorge area. Plants from the eastern region (the Mt Slide form) can reproduce both sexually by seed and clonally by 'root-suckering', and tend to display lower fertility than plants from the western (Daylesford) population which regenerate by seed or by re-shooting from a lignotuber after disturbance events such as fire.  Some clonally reproducing plants in the eastern region have been found to be triploid (three sets of chromosomes) compared to the usual diploid state for this species (2n=20). The Lerderderg Gorge populations show a closer genetic and morphological affinity to plants from the Daylesford area than those from the Kinglake area. Western populations display the greatest range of floral colour variants (with green to dark red styles) while those in eastern populations range from dark red to deep burgundy.

Conservation status
This grevillea is listed as "endangered" under the Victorian Government Flora and Fauna Guarantee Act 1988 and as "rare in Victoria" on the Department of Environment and Primary Industries Advisory List of Rare Or Threatened Plants In Victoria.

References

repens
Flora of Victoria (Australia)
Proteales of Australia
Taxa named by Carl Meissner
Plants described in 1853